Noah Miller may refer to:
 Noah Miller (water polo)
 Noah Miller (baseball)